UK Games Expo (UKGE) is tabletop-game convention and trade fair held annually at the National Exhibition Centre (NEC) and the Hilton Birmingham Metropole.

UK Games Expo is the largest Hobby Games Convention in the UK - where all aspects of the gaming hobby are represented under one roof.
The convention is host to seminars by industry leaders, a charity bring and buy, and board and wargame tournaments, including the UK UK Catan Championships, the UK Carcassonne Championship, and the UK Agricola Championship. Role-playing events included the UK Cthulhu masters, the D&D Open Championships and the D&D Adventurers League Epic. Alongside official tournaments, there are areas for open gaming. Introduced in its first convention, it also hosts its own awards. In 2008 it hosted the official launch of Dungeons & Dragons 4th Edition in the UK.

After the cancellation of the 2020 convention, UK Games Expo 2021 returned to the NEC 30th from July to 1st August, subject to UK COVID restrictions.  In 2022, UK Games Expo recovered to almost full size with 23,000 unique visitors and over 450 exhibitors.

History 

UK Games Expo was initially held at the Clarendon Suites in Birmingham between 2007 and 2012, relocating to the Hilton Birmingham Metropole in 2015. In 2016 it expanded to include trade and tournament halls in the NEC, as well as maintaining activities in the Hilton Hotel. This expansion led to an increase in unique visitors, making it the third largest tabletop gaming event in the world. In 2018 it expanded again, occupying another hall.

In 2020 UKGE was cancelled due to COVID-19 Pandemic, and replaced by the online event Virtually Expo. Approximately 20,000 individual viewers participated in co-ordinated livestreams, video demonstrations and industry chats as well as roleplaying and board gaming over the Virtually Expo's Discord Rooms plus running a number of tournaments .

Notable guests of the show have included Colin Baker in 2016, Ian Livingstone since 2017, Chris Barrie, Monte Cook, Tom Vasel, Martin Wallace, Steve Jackson, John Kovalic, and John Robertson .

Attendance 

Attendance figures released by the organizers are published each year in their exhibitor pack.

2019 unique attendance makes UK Games Expo the largest show of its kind in the UK.

Notes

References

External links 
 www.ukgamesexpo.co.uk Official website

Gaming conventions
2007 establishments in the United Kingdom
Recurring events established in 2007
Annual events in the United Kingdom